Henry Murphy may refer to:

 Henry C. Murphy (1810–1882), American politician
 Henry Murphy (architect) (1857–1954), American architect who was hired by Chiang Kai-shek for a variety of projects
 Henry Murphy (field hockey) (1882–1942), Irish field hockey player
 Henry Murphy (politician) (1921–2006), Canadian politician and judge
 Henry George Murphy (1884–1939), English art deco silversmith
 Henry V. Murphy (1890–1960), American architect who specialized in churches and schools for Roman Catholic clients
 Henry Murphy (bishop) (1912-1973), Catholic bishop of Limerick.

See also
Hank Murphy (disambiguation)
Harry Murphy (disambiguation)